was a JR East railway station located in Minamisanriku, Miyagi Prefecture, Japan. The blue-roofed station platform remained standing after the 2011 tsunami, however the adjacent railway bridge and track (southwest of the station) collapsed. Services have now been replaced by a provisional bus rapid transit line.

Lines
Shizuhama Station was served by the Kesennuma Line, and was located 38.2 rail kilometers from the terminus of the line at Maeyachi Station.

Station layout
Shizuhama Station had a single side platform serving traffic in both directions. The station was unattended.

History
Shizuhama Station opened on 11 December 1977. The station was absorbed into the JR East network upon the privatization of the Japan National Railways (JNR) on April 1, 1987. Operations were discontinued after the station was severely damaged by the 2011 Tōhoku earthquake and tsunami, and rail services have now been replaced by a bus rapid transit line.

Surrounding area
Japan National Route 45
Shizu Elementary School

External links

  JR East Station information 
  video of a train trip from Utatsu Station to Shizugawa Station in 2009, passing Shizuhama Station at around 03:45 minutes without stopping.  Satellite photos (e.g., in Google Maps) showed that much of the landscape visible in the video was severely affected by the 2011 tsunami and most of the railway bridges the train travels across were partly or completely destroyed.  The destination Shizugawa Station was destroyed.
  the destroyed railway bridge a few hundred meters northeast of Shizugawa Station, shot from a car traveling along National Route 45 

Railway stations in Miyagi Prefecture
Kesennuma Line
Railway stations in Japan opened in 1977
Railway stations closed in 2011